Osyris is a genus of plants in the family Santalaceae, one of the many genera known as sandalwoods, but not one of the true sandalwood. The species of this genus are mostly hemiparasitic, meaning although they can survive and grow by themselves, they also opportunistically tap into the root systems of nearby plants and parasitize them.

Selected species:
Osyris alba – common name osyris
Osyris daruma
Osyris compressa – Cape sumach or pruimbos
Osyris lanceolata – African sandalwood
Osyris quadripartita – wild tea plant
Osyris tenuifolia - east African sandalwood

References

 
Santalales genera